The Municipality of Enfield was a local government area of Sydney, New South Wales, Australia. The municipality was proclaimed as the Borough of Enfield on 17 January 1889 and, with an area of 3.6 square kilometres, included the modern suburbs of Croydon, Croydon Park and Strathfield South ("Druitt Town" until 1890s), with parts of Enfield, Belfield and Greenacre included in the West Ward. In 1949, the council was split into two, with Central and East Wards being added to the Municipality of Burwood and the West Ward being added into the Municipality of Strathfield, with the passing of the Local Government (Areas) Act 1948.

Council history and location
Although originally very much of a rural character, by 1888 the population of Enfield area had reached 1500 and 153 local residents submitted a petition on 22 August 1888 to the NSW Governor, Lord Carrington, requesting the formation of a municipality with the name of the "Borough of Enfield" with three wards. The petition was subsequently accepted and the Enfield Borough Council was incorporated on 22 January 1889, consisting of three wards, Central Ward, West Ward and East Ward. The first council was elected on 26 March 1889, with three aldermen elected for each ward:

The council first met on 30 March 1889, with Alderman James Eve elected as the first mayor. Initially renting premises for the council chambers in Tennyson Parade, the council moved to a new town hall on the corner of Liverpool Road and The Parade, Enfield, in 1893. On 10 May 1889, the first town clerk was appointed, Edward A. Pyman. From 28 December 1906, following the passing of the Local Government Act, 1906, the council was renamed as the "Municipality of Enfield".

Later history
In April 1916 the Supreme Court of NSW heard an application from an Enfield ratepayer that the serving mayor, Ebenezer Ford, be removed from office. The case rested on the fact that Ford was a director of the Enfield Park Brick Company Ltd, which had recently been given a contract from the municipality. Justice David Ferguson ruled in the plaintiff's favour, with the result that Ford would be removed from office. However Ford appealed the case to the High Court and the case was overturned by a majority of the court.

In 1930 the council commissioned and completed the Enfield Council Chambers at the junction of Coronation Parade and Liverpool Road, Enfield, designed in the Inter-war stripped classical style by architects Morrow & Gordon. The foundation stone was laid on 1 March 1930 by the mayor, Stanley Lloyd, and the Minister for Local Government, Michael Bruxner.

In November 1933 the council opened the Enfield Olympic Swimming Pool in Henley Park, the first chlorinated freshwater public pool in Sydney designed by architects Rudder & Grout.

By the end of the Second World War, the NSW Government had realised that its ideas of infrastructure expansion could not be effected by the present system of the patchwork of small municipal councils across Sydney and the Minister for Local Government, Joseph Cahill, passed a bill in 1948 that abolished a significant number of those councils. Under the Local Government (Areas) Act 1948, Enfield Municipal Council was split in two, with Central and East Wards being added to the Municipality of Burwood and the West Ward being added into the Municipality of Strathfield. The new Strathfield council was divided into two wards – First Ward and Second Ward, with the Second Ward composed of three aldermen from the Enfield Council area. Former Enfield Aldermen Allan Stanley Hanson, James Clarence Morgan, and William James Weiss were elected to the Second Ward in the 1948 municipal election.

Mayors

Town clerks

References

Enfield
Enfield
Enfield
Enfield
Inner West